Esprit Sylvestre Blanche (15 May 1796, Rouen – 8 November 1852, Paris) was a French psychiatrist.

Biography

His father, Antoine Louise Blanche, was a chief surgeon of the military hospitals of Rouen. After finishing a doctorate of medical studies in 1819 at the Paris School of Medicine, he devoted his life to the study of mental health. He founded a nursing home on the heights of Montmartre, where he took up again principles of a treatment developed by Philippe Pinel, but had his patients keep in touch with a new family instead of isolating them from others. Doctor Blanche counted Nerval and Gounod among his many patients.

In 1826, he moved his Montmartre institution to the Hotel of Lamballe (l’Hôtel de Lamballe) in Passy; the building and its grounds belonged to the Princess of Lamballe.

After his death, his son Émile Blanche, the father of painter Jacques-Émile Blanche, took over the management of his nursing home, which he kept until 1872. Guy de Maupassant, the French writer, stayed there during the last months of his life (1892-1893), at the clinic of Doctor Blanche.

A member of The Medical Board of Association of Dramatic Artists, he was awarded the Legion of Honor (la Légion d’honneur) in 1834.

He married Marie, Madeleine, Sophie Bertrand (1800-1876). His daughter Claire became the wife of architect Léon Ohnet and the mother of writer Georges Ohnet. 
He was also the father of Alfred, born in 1823 and an architect in Paris, and Émile Blanche, born in 1829 and a French psychiatrist. 
He was buried at the 2nd section of Passy Cemetery.

Posterity

A street in Paris (la rue du Docteur Blanche) was named after him. Another street with the same name, in Rouen, owes its name to doctor Antoine Emmanuel Pascal Blanche.

Books

 Du danger des rigueurs corporelles dans le traitement de la folie (On the danger of physical rigors when treating insanity), Paris, Gardembas, 1839
 De l’état actuel de traitement de la folie en France (On the current treatment of insanity in France), Paris, Gardembas, 1840

See also

Bibliography
Georges-Paul Collet, Jacques-Émile Blanche. Le peintre écrivain, Bartillat, 2006, 567p
Théodore-Éloi Lebreton, Biographie rouennaise, Rouen, Le Brument, 1865.
Laure Murat, La Maison du docteur Blanche, Paris, Jean-Claude Lattès, 2001, 424p.

Film

A film named La Clinique du Docteur Blanche (The clinic of Doctor Blanche) was directed by Sarah Lévy in 2014.

References 

 Georges-Paul Collet, Jacques-Émile Blanche. Le peintre écrivain, Éditions Bartillat, Paris, 2006, p. 16-17 
 Cf note 1.
 « La maison du docteur Blanche. Histoire d’un asile et de ses pensionnaires de Nerval à Maupassant » www.ammppu.org
 « La maison du docteur Blanche : histoire d'un asile et de ses pensionnaires, de Nerval à Maupassant » www.franceculture.fr.

1796 births
1852 deaths
French psychiatrists